Sunny Suljic (born August 10, 2005) is an American actor and skateboarder. He is known for his roles as Bob in Yorgos Lanthimos's 2016 drama The Killing of a Sacred Deer and as the voice and motion capture actor for Atreus, the son of Kratos, in the 2018 video game God of War, for which he was nominated for the BAFTA Award for Best Performance in a Video Game. He reprised the role in the game's 2022 sequel, God of War Ragnarök, for which he was nominated for Best Performance at The Game Awards 2022 and the BAFTA Award for Performer in a Leading Role. Suljic had his first lead role in Jonah Hill's film Mid90s, also in 2018.

Life and career
Sunny Suljic was born in Roswell, Georgia. He played Gabriel in the 2015 film 1915, and Bob Murphy in the 2017 film The Killing of a Sacred Deer. In 2018, he played the lead, Stevie (Sunburn), in the drama film Mid90s, directed by Jonah Hill, and had a supporting role as Tarby Corrigan in the fantasy-horror family film The House with a Clock in Its Walls. He also voiced and did the cinematic motion capture for the character Atreus, the son of Kratos, in the 2018 video game God of War, and reprised the role in its 2022 sequel, God of War Ragnarök. Suljic is studying at a local private school in Los Angeles, California.

Filmography

Film

Television

Video games

Music videos

References

External links
 

2005 births
Living people
American male child actors
American male film actors
American male television actors
American male video game actors
American skateboarders
Male actors from Georgia (U.S. state)
Male actors from Atlanta
People from Roswell, Georgia